Church of Our Lady of Mercy of Ullal is a Roman Catholic Church built by the Portuguese in 1568 at Ullal, near Mangalore. The church was mentioned by the Italian traveller Pietro Della Valle, who visited Mangalore in 1623.

Amidst scenic beauty, lush greenery and surrounded by vast oceans lies Ullal-Panir, a Catholic mission centre. It is situated 15 km South of Mangalore, the district headquarters. It is an extensive mission spread over three taluks namely Bantwal, Mangalore and Manjeshwar and consists of over 10 villages.  The parishioners are generally poor, small and  marginal farmers or daily wage earners. At present due to the upcoming of the educational institutions in and around   Ullal-Panir, many people are migrating to this area. The  total catholic population is 2147. Ullal-Panir is the place where the Apostle of Sri. Lank  Blessed Joseph Vas had worked about 318 years ago.

Notes 

Churches in Mangalore Diocese